Dicra is a genus of longhorn beetles of the subfamily Lamiinae, containing the following species:

 Dicra insignicornis Fauvel, 1906
 Dicra nodicornis Fauvel, 1906

References

Enicodini